DeWayne Julius Rogers (May 9, 1948 – August 22, 2020) was an American singer, songwriter, record producer, and multi-instrumentalist. He was best known for the tender acoustic piano-based ballad "Say You Love Me", a charting single from his 1975 RCA album It's Good to Be Alive. Natalie Cole's cover of the song was the first single from her album Snowfall on the Sahara, released by WEA and Elektra Entertainment in June 1999.

Discography

Studio albums

Singles

References

External links
 
 
 https://www.mercurynews.com/2020/08/24/d-j-rogers-an-underappreciated-soul-music-talent-dies-at-72/

1948 births
2020 deaths
Singers from Los Angeles
21st-century African-American male singers
American male singers
American rhythm and blues singers
RCA Records artists
Columbia Records artists